The Comedy Cellar is a comedy club in Manhattan where many top New York comedians perform. It is widely considered to be the best comedy club in the United States. It was founded in 1982 by then stand-up comedian, and current television writer/producer Bill Grundfest. It is located in Greenwich Village on 117 Macdougal Street between West 3rd Street and Minetta Lane. Above the club is a restaurant called The Olive Tree Cafe to which it is connected, where many of the comedians hang out after performing. The club is owned by Noam Dworman, who inherited it from his late father, Manny, and run by booker Estee Adoram, who has developed the club's talent for nearly four decades. The businesses share the same menu, kitchen, and staff. 

The Comedy Cellar, like The Comedy Store, uses a showcase format, as opposed to a headline format like most clubs. A show will consist of between five and seven comics performing sets of roughly 10-15 minutes each. Each week consists of three to six shows a night on Sunday through Thursday and ten shows each Friday and Saturday, between both the original room and the larger Village Underground around the corner.

Notable comedians 
Notable Comedians started with stage time at the Comedy Cellar, going on to become legends, such as Louis C.K., Dave Chappelle, Dave Attell, Todd Barry, Judah Friedlander, Colin Quinn, Kevin Hart, Jim Norton, Jeff Ross, Mitch Fatel, Darrell Hammond, Michael Mittermeier, Rich Vos, Nick Di Paolo, Artie Lange, Greer Barnes, and Marc Maron. 

Popular established comedians frequently perform at the Comedy Cellar, including Dov Davidoff, Mark Normand, Ryan Hamilton, Robert Kelly, Harrison Greenbaum, Sherrod Small, Keith Robinson, Eric Neumann, Gregg Rogell, Nikki Glaser, Ben Bailey and Andrew Schulz.

Celebrity comedians Aziz Ansari and Jon Stewart started their comedy careers at the Comedy Cellar, and both continue to occasionally perform there. Other celebrity comics who have performed at the club include Sarah Silverman, Amy Schumer, Robin Williams, Patton Oswalt, Kevin Hart, Chris Rock, Bill Burr, and Matteo Lane. Musician John Mayer has also been seen performing stand-up.

In the media 
Much of Jerry Seinfeld's 2002 documentary Comedian was filmed at the club, and it also can be seen in a 2006 Pepsi commercial starring Jimmy Fallon.

The beginning sequence of Louis CK's television series Louie shows him walking into the Comedy Cellar. Many scenes in the show are filmed in and around the Comedy Cellar and Olive Tree Cafe. Speaking with ESPN's Bill Simmons about the club on a Grantland podcast in June 2012, CK discussed playing shows at the Cellar to empty rooms in the 1990s, stating that then-owner Manny Dworman "kept comedy alive" by making comedians perform on empty stages, in an effort to lure in potential customers. The club was also featured in Chris Rock's film Top Five, including a performance by his character, Andre Allen. It appeared regularly on HBO's Crashing, and is the home for Comedy Central's "This Week At The Comedy Cellar"

In September 2015, the club launched its public-policy debate series with a debate on the Iran nuclear deal. The debate featured professor and lawyer Alan Dershowitz and journalist Fred Kaplan, among others.

The New York Post regularly rates the Cellar as the best comedy club in New York. 

In March 2016, writers Jessica Pilot and Katla McGylnn wrote an oral history of the club for Vanity Fair.

The club has been the location for comedians taping Netflix specials. Aziz Ansari shot his special Nightclub Comedian at the Comedy Cellar in 2021; Ray Romano recorded his special there in 2019, called Right Around the Corner; Dave Attell and Jeff Ross recorded their Netflix series Bumping Mics with Jeff Ross & Dave Attell in 2018.

Las Vegas location 
In 2018, the Comedy Cellar opened a third location at the Rio Hotel in Las Vegas.

References

Further reading

External links

Building and fiber specifications

Comedy clubs in Manhattan
Greenwich Village